Preah Vihear (UNGEGN: Preăh Vĭhar, ALA-LC: Braḥ Vihār ; lit. 'sacred sanctuary') is a province (khaet) of Cambodia. It borders the provinces of Oddar Meanchey and Siem Reap to the west, Kampong Thom to the south and Stung Treng to the east. Its northern boundary forms part of Cambodia's international border with Thailand and Laos. Its capital is Preah Vihear.

Description
The province is named after the temple of Prasat Preah Vihear. The Dângrêk Mountains and the Cambodia/Thailand border are in the north of Preah Vihear province.

Preah Vihear is one of the nine provinces that are part of the Tonle Sap Biosphere Reserve.

Administrative divisions
The province is divided into seven districts and one municipality, further divided into 51 communes.

Sites
 Koh Ker complex: Koh Ker was once the capital city of Khmer Empire
 Bakan or Preah Khan Kompong Svay complex: 105 kilometres southwest of the provincial town, built under the reign of King Suryavarman I (1002–1050)
 Noreay Temples: five 7th-century temples made of Sandstone, laterite and brick, 32 kilometres northeast of the town.
 Phnom Pralean temple: a temple built to worship Brahmanism, on top of a 180 metres hill
 Neak Buos temple: 75 kilometres north of Tbaeng Meanchey
 Krapum Chhouk temple: built in the 10th century in laterite and stone, 45 kilometres south of Tbaeng Meanchey
 Kork Beng temple: a ruined laterite and sandstone temple built between 936 and 951 by a commander named Kork on the order of King Jayavarman IV
 Wat Peung Preah Ko: a place of worship in beautiful natural surroundings believed to possess strong supernatural powers.
 Preah Vihear Temple: built in the 12th century, located between Thailand and Cambodia. It was listed as World Heritage Site in 2008.

References

External links
 Preah-Vihear.com - Preah Vihear Temple and the Thai's Misunderstanding of the World Court Judgment of 15 June 1962
 

 
Provinces of Cambodia